The 2006 North Queensland Cowboys season was the 12th in the club's history. Coached by Graham Murray and captained by Travis Norton, they competed in the NRL's 2006 Telstra Premiership.

Season summary 
Coming off the back of their maiden Grand Final appearance, the Cowboys were strong premiership favourites heading into the 2006 season. They looked like they would be living up to those expectations, with a six-game winning streak to start the season. It wouldn't last though, as the club would lose eight of their next 10, including a six-game losing streak which left them outside the Top 8 halfway through the season. A win against arch-rivals Brisbane in the Queensland derby put them into 6th place with six games remaining but they would lose Johnathan Thurston to injury and another losing streak followed, dashing their finals aspirations. Wins over South Sydney and Parramatta ended their season a good note but it wasn't enough, the pre-season title favourites finishing the season in 9th.

Despite the disappointing season, 2006 saw the debut of club legend Gavin Cooper, who made his debut in Round 2. Cooper would leave the club at the end of the year, spending two seasons with the Gold Coast Titans and two with the Penrith Panthers before rejoining the Cowboys in 2011. Cooper would become an integral part of the club, starting in their 2015 NRL Grand Final and 2016 World Club Challenge winning sides.

2006 was also the final season for club stalwarts Travis Norton and Matt Sing. Norton, who captained the side from 2004 to 2007, and Sing, who scored 73 tries for the club and rejuvenated his career in the process, were key figures in the club's transformation from cellar dwellers into a credible premiership threat. In 2015, Sing was one of the two inaugural inductees into the Cowboys Hall of Fame.

Milestones 
 Round 2: Clint Amos and Gavin Cooper made their NRL debuts.
 Round 4: Mitchell Sargent played his 50th game for the club.
 Round 5: Shane Tronc played his 50th game for the club.
 Round 5: Gavin Cooper scored his first NRL try.
 Round 7: Steve Southern played his 50th game for the club.
 Round 7: Ashley Graham made his debut for the club.
 Round 10: Robert Tanielu made his debut for the club.
 Round 14: Travis Norton played his 50th game for the club.
 Round 16: Rod Jensen played his 50th game for the club.
 Round 16: Ray Cashmere made his debut for the club.
 Round 17: Mark Henry and Brent McConnell made their NRL debuts.
 Round 17: Brent McConnell scored his first NRL try.
 Round 21: Mark Henry scored his first NRL try.
 Round 22: David Faiumu played his 50th game for the club.
 Round 22: Matt Sing played his 100th game for the club.
 Round 26: Josh Hannay played his 150th game for the club.

Squad List

Squad Movement

2006 Gains

2006 Losses

Ladder

Fixtures

Regular season

Statistics 

Source:

Representatives 
The following players played a representative match in 2006.

Honours

League 
 Wally Lewis Medal: Johnathan Thurston

Club 
 Player of the Year: Aaron Payne
 Player's Player: Luke O'Donnell
 Club Person of the Year: Glen Murphy

Feeder Clubs

Queensland Cup 
  North Queensland Young Guns - 2nd, lost semi final

References

External links 
 Official North Queensland Cowboys Website

North Queensland Cowboys seasons
North Queensland Cowboys season